Benedict of Poland (Latin: Benedictus Polonus, Polish Benedykt Polak) (c. 1200 – c. 1280) was a Polish Franciscan friar, traveler, explorer, and interpreter.

He accompanied Giovanni da Pian del Carpine in his journey as delegate of Pope Innocent IV to the Great Khan Güyük of the Mongol Empire in 1245–1247. He was the author of the brief chronicle De itinere Fratrum Minorum ad Tartaros (On the Journey of the Franciscan Friars to the Tatars), not published until 1839 in France, and a year later in Poland, and the source for a longer work, Hystoria Tartarorum (History of the Tatars), discovered later and eventually published in 1965.

The report of Benedict is important because it includes a copy of the letter of the Great Khan to the Pope.

Biography
Little is known about the life of Friar Benedict beyond the story of the journey.

He was well educated and spoke and wrote Latin, Polish, and Old East Slavic. He had become a monk in the Franciscan monastery in Wrocław about 1236. This was the first major stop of Friar Giovanni after leaving on the mission from Lyon in April 1245. Benedict was chosen to accompany him as an interpreter because he  had also acquired a knowledge of the Old East Slavic language and the first part of their journey was to Kyiv. Benedict made his accounts of the journey during and after their return in 1247. After returning from the voyage he probably settled in the Franciscan monastery in Kraków where he spent the rest of his life. Later he was also a witness at the canonization of Saint Stanislaus of Szczepanów in 1252.

References

Palkiewicz, Jacek and Petek, Krzysztof
Benedykt Polak : pierwszy polski podroznik
Warszawa : Narodowe Centrum Kultury, 2015

See also
 Giovanni da Pian del Carpine
 Exploration of Asia

Polish Friars Minor
Writers from Wrocław
Polish explorers
13th-century explorers
Explorers of Asia
Roman Catholic missionaries in China
Interpreters
1200 births
1280 deaths
Year of birth uncertain
Year of death uncertain
Missionary linguists